Chen Chun-wei (born 24 April 1997) is a Taiwanese male badminton player.

Achievements

BWF International Challenge/Series
Men's Singles

 BWF International Challenge tournament
 BWF International Series tournament
 BWF Future Series tournament

References

External links
 

Taiwanese male badminton players
1997 births
Living people
21st-century Taiwanese people